Illinois Route 114 is a rural east–west state route that connects State Road 10 in Indiana, USA, with Illinois Route 1 and Illinois Route 17 (Dixie Highway), which overlap in Momence.

Route description 
Illinois 114 follows the southern bank of the Kankakee River for its entire length, and is the access road for the small camps on the Kankakee River east of Momence. It is a two-lane, undivided surface road.

History 
SBI Route 114 was established in 1924. Its routing has not changed since it was initially designated.

Major intersections

References 

114
Transportation in Kankakee County, Illinois